Rodney Celvin Akwensivie (born 25 November 1996) is a Malaysian professional 
footballer who plays as a centre-back for Malaysia Super League club Kedah Darul Aman.

International career

Malaysia U23
In March 2016, Akwensivie received his first call-up to the Malaysia U23s for the centralised training camp as a preparation for friendly match against Philippines U23s and Nepal U23s. Rodney was named in the 20-man Malaysia Squad for the 2018 Asian Games. On 20 August 2018, he made his international debut for Malaysia U23s against Bahrain. In that match, he came on as a substitute, and Malaysia loss 2–3.

Personal life
Akwensivie was born in Serian, Sarawak to a Bidayuh mother and a Ghanaian-Malaysian father. He also has a brother, Abbel who also plays for Sarawak.

Club statistics

References

External links
 

1996 births
Sarawak FA players
PKNS F.C. players
Selangor FA players
Kedah Darul Aman F.C. players
Malaysia Super League players
Living people
People from Sarawak
Malaysian people of Ghanaian descent
Bidayuh people
Malaysian footballers
Association football central defenders
Footballers at the 2018 Asian Games
Asian Games competitors for Malaysia